Stewart Carr (born September 11, 1966) is an American sprint canoer who competed in the early 1990s. At the 1992 Summer Olympics in Barcelona, he was eliminated in the semifinals of the C-2 500 m event.

References
Sports-Reference.com profile

1966 births
American male canoeists
Canoeists at the 1992 Summer Olympics
Place of birth missing (living people)
Living people
Olympic canoeists of the United States